Karim Hirji is a Ugandan businessman, hotel owner and entrepreneur. He is reported to be one of the wealthiest individuals in Uganda, with an estimated net worth of about US$800 million.

History
During the 1960s and 1970s, Hirji was a champion automobile racing driver. During the late 1980s and early 1990s, he began trading in textiles and alcoholic beverages from a shop in central Kampala. His first company Dembe Enterprises has since expanded into the Dembe Group of Companies, a conglomerate that includes a radio station, an automobile dealership, a finance and insurance business, an amusement park and the Imperial Hotels Group chain. He also owns the former Uganda Commercial Bank Towers, which he renamed Cham Towers.

See also
 List of wealthiest people in Uganda
 List of hotels in Uganda
 List of tallest buildings in Kampala

References

External links
Karim Hirji – Driver Profile
Tycoon Karim In The Spotlight Over Chogm Money

Living people
Ugandan businesspeople in real estate
Businesspeople in the hospitality industry
Ugandan businesspeople
Ugandan Ismailis
Businesspeople of Indian descent
1950 births
People from Kampala